Ben Parry is a retired American soccer defender who played professionally in the USISL.

Youth
In 1993, Parry graduated from North Stanly High School where he was an All State soccer player.  He attended UNC Charlotte where he was a 1997 Second Team All American.

Professional
In 1996, Parry played for the Cocoa Expos. On February 1, 1998, the San Jose Clash selected Parry in the first round (third overall) of the 1998 MLS College Draft.  He spent most of the beginning of the season on injured reserve before going on loan to the MLS Project 40 team for three weeks. He contracted a serious stomach virus while touring Mexico during the 1998 pre season. Parry was projected to be the starting right back during the 1998 season. He was released at the end of the 1998 season after sitting on the injured reserve list the entirety of the 1998 season. He signed with the Charleston Battery of the USISL for the remainder of the season.  In 1999, he played for the Raleigh Capital Express and in 2001 with the Charlotte Eagles. He had a 2000 pre season trial with the San Jose Earthquakes but failed to earn a contract.

References

External links
 
 

1976 births
Living people
American soccer players
Charleston Battery players
Charlotte Eagles players
Charlotte 49ers men's soccer players
Cocoa Expos players
Raleigh (Capital) Express players
San Jose Earthquakes players
A-League (1995–2004) players
MLS Pro-40 players
San Jose Earthquakes draft picks
Association football defenders